The 1999 Big East Conference baseball tournament was held at Mercer County Waterfront Park in Trenton, New Jersey. This was the fifteenth annual Big East Conference baseball tournament, and first to be held outside the state of Connecticut. The  won the tournament championship and claimed the Big East Conference's automatic bid to the 1999 NCAA Division I baseball tournament.

Format and seeding 
The Big East baseball tournament was a 6 team double elimination tournament in 1999. The top six regular season finishers were seeded one through six based on conference winning percentage only.

Bracket

Jack Kaiser Award 
Marc DesRoches was the winner of the 1999 Jack Kaiser Award. DesRoches was a senior pitcher for Providence.

References 

Tournament
Big East Conference Baseball Tournament
Big East Conference baseball tournament
Big East Conference baseball tournament
Baseball in New Jersey
College sports in New Jersey
History of Trenton, New Jersey
Sports competitions in New Jersey
Sports in Trenton, New Jersey
Tourist attractions in Trenton, New Jersey